Klagopsalmer (roughly, Hymns of Lament) is the sixth album by Shining. It was released on 30 June 2009, by Osmose Productions.

Track 4 is a cover version of Seigmen's "Ohm" (from the Total album). "Ohm" is sung in Norwegian, making it the only song on the album not sung in Swedish.

Samplings on the album are from the 1979 documentary, Ett anständigt liv, by Stefan Jarl.

Erik Danielsson from Swedish black metal band Watain is responsible for the album cover art.

Track listing

Personnel
 Niklas Kvarforth –  vocals, guitars, and concept
 Fredric Gråby – lead and rhythm guitars
 Peter Huss – lead and rhythm guitars
 Andreas Larssen – bass guitar
 Rickard Schill – drums
 Marcus Pålsson – grand piano
 Linnea Olsson – cello
 Margareta Olsson – viola
 Birgit Huss – violin
 Lars Fredrik Frøislie – keyboards

References

External links
Klagopsalmer at discogs

2009 albums
Shining (Swedish band) albums
Osmose Productions albums